Sworn Brothers (Chinese: 肝膽相照) is a 1987  Hong Kong action crime drama film directed by David Lai and starring Andy Lau and Cheung Kwok-keung as step brothers on the opposite sides of the law as a triad and cop respectively.

Plot
When Lam Ting-yat was little, his father died and he was raised by police officer Uncle Pau and was very close to his son Ngan Kwok just like brothers. Now Kwok has become a police inspector who just came back to Hong Kong after training in the Scotland Yard and Ting is a triad member working for crime lord Yeung Tung-hoi. Despite being on the opposite side of the law, they still maintain a close relationship.

When Kwok came back to Hong Kong, he and his father and Ting had dinner and afterwards they went out and competed on who can pee the longest in an alley. There, they see a police officer Shek, nicknamed Portuguese, harass a call girl and Ting fights with him and Kwok helps him and cuffs Shek on a cart and pushes him down the alley.

The next day Kwok reports to the police and is given a case of investigating Yeung's gang and Shek, who has been following this case, was assigned as his subordinate to assist him. In the files, Kwok also sees a file of Ting.

Later, on a ship, Ting meets a singer girl named Peggy who asks him to use his phone and offers to pay him two dollars for using his phone. However, she did not have money at that time and saves it as a debt.

Ting, Kwok and Pau go to a temple where Pau pays respect to Ting's father and asking for his blessing of Ting being safe, Kwok being promoted soon and his own health since his suffers from heart disease. Outside of the temple, Kwok asks Ting about his boss being involved in drug trafficking which Ting replies he does not know about it. Kwok tells Ting that he is not asking for tips from him but is trying to help him and not arrest him one day. Ting tells him about his plan to emigrated to America and jokingly asks him to teach him English. Before leaving, Ting goes back inside the temple and kneels in front of his father's grave. Afterwards, Ting goes to a private hospital and gives HK100,000 to the doctor to do surgery for Pau but also tells him to not tell Pau that the money came from him.

Ting then goes to his boss Yeung and tells of his plan to quit the triads and emigrate to America and Yeung tells him he will ask his underling Paul to help him deal with his immigration procedure. Afterwards, Ting goes down to his car where his parking meter just expired and Peggy was just there to pay it for him. Peggy says that she owed him two dollars last time and paid four dollars for the parking meter, which makes Ting owe her two dollars now. Ting offers Peggy a ride to her outdoor concert which she refuses and prefers to ride the train instead. While Peggy was riding on the train, Ting follows her in his car.

At the concert, Peggy trips and falls on stage which saddens her when everyone boos at her. Peggy goes to the side and cries, until Ting comes by and consoles her and takes her out to dinner and stay overnight at his house. At the same time, someone also attempted to assassinate Yeung where he was stabbed on his hips.

In the morning, Peggy unsuccessfully attempts to make breakfast at Ting's house and burns the food and offers him a piece of chocolate for breakfast which Ting replies he wants congee and youtiao. When Peggy is about to leave, Ting gives her a watch to which Peggy replies that they are "common friends, easy come easy go". Later, Kwok comes up to Ting's house where he buys him breakfast and makes coffee and sees Peggy, who attempts to leave through the back door. Kwok asks him whether it is his girlfriend to which Ting replies "common friend, easy come, easy go". He then proceeds to tell Kwok his plans to emigrate to America next week.

Later, Ting goes to a facial center where Peggy works and gives her several boxes of chocolate. She refuses it in front of him and gives it to her fat colleague but takes a bite at one when Ting leaves and he sees her doing so.

At Yeung's estate, he wants Ting to settle a problem with rival Fung which Ting refuses due to sticking to principles. When everyone blames Ting to be a defector, he decides to help his boss and brings his underlings Ka-lok and Chan Kwo with him. Later, it is revealed that the assassination attempt was set up by Yeung so Ting would help him.

When Ting and his crew make it to Fung's place, Ting and Kwo goes up and asks Ka-lok to wait in the car. While discussing with Fung, Ting and Fung get into a heated argument when Fing wants a bigger piece of the pie and Ting beats Fung's head on the table which then all of Fung's henchmen drew their guns at Ting. Fung asks Ting where is Yeung's cocaine, which the latter refuses to tell and Fung then ties up Kwo and beats him with a hammer. Ka-lok hears noise from downstairs and proceeds to get guns and alcohol from his trunk while also seeing his mother in the streets, who have not seen him in a while. After a brief talk with his mother, Ka-lok proceeds to go up the building and comes in and throws the alcohol which causes a fire and shoots at Fung's henchmen. After Ka-lok runs out of ammunition, one of Fung's henchmen shot and killed him which then Ting fights the henchmen and stabs him with a dart before killing him with his gun. Fung escapes by jumping out the window to the next floor and Ting chases him by jumping down floor by floor to the street and finally confront him and shoots him multiple times to death.

Afterwards, Ting gives a call to Peggy who then goes to his house and treat his injuries. There, she cries and tells him that her heart aches while seeing him bleeding. Ting asks her that she said "easy come, easy go", but Peggy finally confesses that she loves him.

At the police station, Sergeant Shek tells Commander Chan Chung-hon that he found evidence that Ting killed Fung. Commander Chan then gives permission to Shek to arrest Ting. When Shek and his crew arrive at Ting's house, Peggy tries to stop them but is beaten up by them and Ting escapes through the back door to the top of the building. Ting manages to overpower Shek's crew and then Shek holds Peggy hostage at the top of the building. Ting then hits Shek's gun away with a metal pole and fights with him until Shek is about to fall off the edge of the building. Shek begs for Ting's help and offers a deal to not arrest him if he saves him and Ting tries to pull him up. At that time, Kwok also comes to his house and seeing it all messed up with the window broken and some blood, he comes to the top of the building and sees Ting where he says he will arrest him for killing a police officer. After pulling Shek up, Shek proceeds to fight Ting where Kwok helps Ting to fend him off. Kwok then points his gun towards Ting where Shek tries to hit him with a metal pole from behind which then Ting kicks him off the building but landed on the air conditioners. When Kwok tries to arrest Ting, Peggy takes the metal pole and hits Kwok's back and she and Ting leave.

At the police station, Commander Chan demotes Kwok after knowing about his close relationship with Ting and after reading Shek's report stating he saw Kwok letting Ting go. After leaving his office, Shek comes by and humiliates Kwok, who proceeds to fight with him before being stopped by his colleagues. Kwok then goes to a private restaurant where Yeung and his underling Fat Ko Wai are eating and attempts to arrest Yeung before being kicked out by the manager since he does not have a warrant.

The next day, Ting goes to the estate of Yeung, who gives him a large sum of money to illegally enter Brazil, to which Ting asks Yeung to give half of the money to Ka-lok and Kwo's families. Yeung then expresses he does not want Ting to leave and tells him to take care. Ting then tells Peggy his plan to go Brazil and cannot take her with him since he is a wanted criminal and does not know what will happen. Peggy then convinces Ting to take her with him by stating she wants to start a new life with him and if he lives, he would have no friends, and Shek would kill her if he tries to find him. Ting finally agrees to take her with him and tells her he will go pick her up at 3 AM after visiting Uncle Pau.

At Pau's house, while he was fixing something, Ting knocks but ignores him to which then Ting climbs in. Ting then apologizes to Pau and gives him a sum of money which Pau refuses and states that Ting needs it more than himself. At first, Pau refuses to let Ting in the house and close the window shades but he was actually trying to hide Ting and lets him in and tells him to leave through the back door as there are people spying on him outside. He tells him to not trust anyone and depend on himself. Before leaving, Ting puts the money on top of a shelf. Then, Shek comes by and attempts to search the house without a warrant. Pau attempts to stop him but Shek pushes him away and tries to find Ting. Later, Pau unsuccessfully try to tackle Shek and Shek leaves. Ting comes back in the house and sees Pau having a heart attack and Ting gives him his medicine while trying to leave the house to the hospital, Shek comes back and Ting begs Shek to allow him to take Pau to the hospital. When Shek refuses, he tries beat him and Pau bites his leg and Ting pushes him to a rake where he was stabbed to death.

Ting then takes Pau to the hospital and tries to hide his face when he sees his wanted poster on the wall. When the police recognizes him, he runs. Then, Kwok comes into the hospital and was informed by his colleague that Ting brought Pau to the hospital and is running now. Kwok then receives a message from Ting and he calls him back which Ting tells him he needs to take good care of Pau and he has left money at his house while also stating they might not see each other again. In the hospital, Pau asks Kwok to help Ting leave Hong Kong safely.

Ting goes to pick Peggy up but was confronted by Kwok in the parking lot where Kwok questions him how many has he killed. Kwok is determined to arrest Ting for killing people. Peggy then tells Kwok that Ting saved his father's life and risked himself as a wanted criminal to take his father to the hospital. Ting then tells Peggy to shut up stating that it is between him and his brother and is none of her business. Peggy states Kwok is not worthy enough to be Ting's brother since she understand him better than a brother of over 20 years. Ting holds his hands up and Kwok proceeds to cuff him but Peggy takes Kwok's gun and points at him saying this is Ting's last chance and asks him whether he really wants to arrest Ting and have him imprisoned for life. She also states their future is depending on him and begs him to let them go. Ting then takes the gun and tells Kwok that they were childhood friends who both dreamed of being cops. They both joined the police academy together but Ting was unsuccessful. He also tells him he does not want to be a wanted criminal and have no choice but to leave. Ting gives Kwok back his gun and finally agrees to let them go while also offering his motorbike to them since Ting's car is being tracked by the police.

On the ship leaving Hong Kong, Ting and Peggy happily talk about their life in the future stating that there will be hardship, but they can start a new life. Peggy then jokingly warns Ting not try to court girls in Brazil since she heard that they are very nice. Ting says Brazilian girls are dark skinned and have body odor and would only love Peggy. Peggy then says she wishes their children in the future to join the Brazilian soccer team and play at the World Cup. Ting then asks Peggy how long have they known and Peggy clearly remembers it has been a month and six days. Ting also asks whether she will worry that he might leave her to which she replies she is the only girl in Brazil without body odor. As they are kissing, Fat Ko comes up and shoots Ting in the back and he falls into the water and the ship explodes which kills Peggy and several of Yeung's henchmen. Yeung watches this on the shore with his lawyer.

At Yeung's estate, his lawyer tells him Ting will find out that Yeung was the mastermind behind this and he would testify against him. Yeung then decides to kill him but his lawyer tell him that it is impossible to do so since he is a wanted criminal and he is locked up tightly.

Kwok visits Ting at the hospital and brings him a jar of soup. There, Ting asks Kwok about Uncle Pau's condition and tells him not to tell Pau that he is in prison since it would greatly upset him. Ting then gets angry and upset and Kwok tells him not to be upset and saying he would serve a lighter term if he cooperates with the police. However, Ting states that even so, he would still have to serve 30 to 50 years in prison and would be old when he comes out and would be useless. He is only in his twenties and he is afraid. Kwok then tells him that being in jail does not mean there is no more hope. Ting then says over the past ten years he has not done anything right and is a failure and says he will do something right this time by testifying against Yeung and helping Kwok recover his position. He tells Kwok that he will think it over in prison and is determined to become a good person again. Kwok leaves and steps in to his car but upon seeing Ting's watch, he comes back and gives it to the officers to safely store it for him.

While showering, a prisoner tries to stab Ting but misses and stabs someone else. Another prisoner strangles Ting with a towel and Ting was stabbed. The injured prisoner crawls out calling for help and Kwok sees this and goes in the shower room with the other officers. Kwok sees Ting being tortured by two prisoners and hits one of them to the wall while other smashes his head with a piece of glass which knocks him unconscious.

At the hospital, the doctor tells Pau that Kwok's left brain was devastated and dry blood are on his brain stem which causes his brain to be heavily injured. The doctors states that if he does not do surgery immediately, he would become aphasia, if worse, may become hemiplegic. Pau then asks the doctor the probability that the operation would be successful to which the doctor replies fifty percent.

Afterwards, Pau visits Ting and seeing him all injured, he is sorry to his father. He tells Ting that since he was a child, he treated him very well as his own son and would only beat Kwok for misbehaving and when he wants to beat him, he would think of his father and give him a lot of freedom. Pau now realizes that this is a mistake and saying that he does have much time left but hopes to see the two brothers have a successful career and family. Seeing Kwok being heavily injured in the brain and Ting being beaten badly and in prison, Pau is greatly saddened and has a heart attack and is taken away by the nurse.

Later, when Ting sees Yeung on the newspaper, he becomes furious and decides to escape from prison by holding a nurse hostage. After he successfully escapes, he goes to an opening ceremony of a Buddhist temple where Yeung funded to build. There, Ting takes out his gun and attempts to shoot Yeung but her daughter Lai-chu blocks him. However, Yeung pushes his daughter away and runs towards Ting was being tackled and cuffed by the police. At that time, Yeung was also informed that her daughter has a miscarriage which makes her greatly mad at her father.

Ting and Yeung were brought to court and were charged for 28 cases of smuggling and 15 cases of instructing murder during 1974 to 1986. Since their crimes were major, they are not allowed for bail. However, Yeung's lawyer tell the judge that his client is a public figure in Hong Kong who must attend public meetings during the week and may not be locked up. The judge then allowed Yeung to be bailed on HK$3 million cash and must give out his travel passports. During the second court trial, Ting's lawyer convinced the judge that Ting lost his parents during childhood and never had a proper education while also being stressed by Yeung while Yeung's lawyer stated that his client is a rich tycoon with a net worth of HK$500 million and would not smuggle for only $3–4 million and the lack of evidence against him. In the end, the jury decided Ting to be guilty and Yeung not guilty. Ting was pleaded guilty by the judge and is sentenced to capital punishment since murder is a cruel crime and selling drugs does great harm to the community while Yeung is pleaded not guilty is released immediately. After the trial, Kwok, who is wearing a neck brace comes and gives a hug to Ting while he is actually giving Ting a chance to pull out his gun and shoot Yeung multiple times to death and the bailiffs were trying to stop him. After killing Yeung, Ting drops the gun and he and Kwok happily raise their hands up.

Cast
Andy Lau as Lam Ting-yat
Cheung Kwok-keung as Inspector Ngan Kwok
Siu Hung-mui as Peggy / Man-man
Bill Tung as Uncle Ngan Pau
Peter Yang as Yeung Tung-hoi
Wong Chi-keung as Fat Ko Wai
Kan Tat-wah as Sergeant Shek / Portuguese
Fung Yuen-chi as Fung
Ka Lee as Chan Kwo
Chin Kar-lok as Ka-lok
Wan To-ming
Eddy Ko as Commander Chan Chung-hon
Pauline Wong as Yeung Lai-chu
Tony Au as Doctor
Pan Yun-sang as Fung's henchman
Shum Lo as Chu's father in-law
Lui Tat
Jackson Ng
Cheung Wing-cheung
Paul Fonoroff as man in court
Cheung Yuen-wah as Peggy's colleague
Yu Kwok-lok as Fung's henchman
Ng Kwok-kin as policeman
Chow Kam-kong as Yeung's thug
Fei Pak as Policeman
Chui Fat as thug
Yuen Tak as thug

Theme song
What is Between (當中究竟)
Composer: Lik Fung
Lyricist: Lo Kwok-chim
Singer: Andy Lau

Box office
The film grossed HK$8,480,443 at the Hong Kong box office during its theatrical run from 12 March to 2 April 1987 in Hong Kong.

See also
Andy Lau filmography
Sammo Hung filmography

External links

Sworn Brothers at Hong Kong Cinemagic

1987 films
1980s crime action films
1987 crime drama films
Hong Kong crime action films
Hong Kong crime drama films
Triad films
Police detective films
1980s Cantonese-language films
Golden Harvest films
Films set in Hong Kong
Films shot in Hong Kong
1980s Hong Kong films